Patrick Mahoney VC (1827 – 30 October 1857) was an Irish recipient of the Victoria Cross, the highest and most prestigious award for gallantry in the face of the enemy that can be awarded to British and Commonwealth forces.

Details
He was about 30 years old, and a sergeant in the 1st Madras European Fusiliers (later The Royal Dublin Fusiliers), Madras Army during the Indian Mutiny when the following deed took place for which he was awarded the VC:

For distinguished gallantry (whilst doing duty with the Volunteer Cavalry) in aiding in the capture of the Regimental Colour of the 1st Regiment Native Infantry, at Mungulwar, on the 21st of September, 1857.

(Extract from Field Force Orders of the late Major-General Havelock, dated 17 October 1857.)

He was killed in action at Lucknow, India, on 30 October 1857.

References

The Register of the Victoria Cross (1981, 1988 and 1997)

Ireland's VCs  (Dept of Economic Development 1995)
Monuments to Courage (David Harvey, 1999)
Irish Winners of the Victoria Cross (Richard Doherty & David Truesdale, Four Courts, 2000 )

1827 births
1857 deaths
Irish soldiers in the British East India Company Army
19th-century Irish people
People from County Waterford
Irish recipients of the Victoria Cross
Indian Rebellion of 1857 recipients of the Victoria Cross
British military personnel killed in the Indian Rebellion of 1857